A computer system is a nominally complete computer that includes the hardware, operating system (main software), and the means to use peripheral equipment needed and used for full or mostly full operation. Such systems may constitute personal computers (including desktop computers, portable computers, laptops, all-in-ones, and more), mainframe computers, minicomputers, servers, and workstations, among other classes of computing. The following is a list of notable manufacturers and sellers of computer systems, both present and past.

Current

Inactive

See also
 Market share of personal computer vendors
 List of computer hardware manufacturers
 List of laptop brands and manufacturers
 List of touch-solution manufacturers

Notes

References

 
Computing by company
Computing-related lists
Lists of manufacturers
Lists of information technology companies